Five ships of the French Navy have borne the name Ça Ira ("It will be fine") in honour of the revolutionary anthem Ah! ça ira

French ships named Ça Ira 

 , a 74-gun ship of the line, was renamed Ça Ira in 1792 
 Couronne (1781), an 80-gun ship of the line, was renamed Ça Ira in 1792
 A gunship (1794)
 A gunship (1795-1796)

Notes and references

Notes

References

Bibliography 
 

French Navy ship names